The 2016 Championship League was a professional non-ranking snooker tournament that was played from 4 January to 3 March 2016 at the Crondon Park Golf Club in Stock, England.

Stuart Bingham was the defending champion, but he was eliminated at the league stage of group seven. Judd Trump clinched his third Championship League title after a 3–2 win over Ronnie O'Sullivan in the final. Mark Williams took the largest share of the prize money thanks to a lucrative campaign through 4 groups before qualifying for the winners' group.

Fergal O'Brien made the 118th official maximum break during his league stage match against Mark Davis in group six. This was O'Brien's first official 147 break and the fourth in the 2015/2016 season. O'Brien also became the oldest player to make an official 147, at the age of 43. His record was surpassed in the following year's edition of the Championship League, when Mark Davis became the oldest player to score a maximum break, at the age of 44. Davis even scored two 147s in that year's Championship League.

Prize fund
The breakdown of prize money for this year is shown below. The maximum possible prize money, if the full five frames are played in each game, is £205,000.

Group 1–7
Winner: £3,000
Runner-up: £2,000
Semi-final: £1,000
Frame-win (league stage): £100
Frame-win (play-offs): £300
Highest break: £500
Winners' group
Winner: £10,000
Runner-up: £5,000
Semi-final: £3,000
Frame-win (league stage): £200
Frame-win (play-offs): £300
Highest break: £1,000

Tournament total: £179,700

Group one
Group one was played on 4 and 5 January 2016. Ronnie O'Sullivan was the first player to qualify for the winners group.

Matches

Ronnie O'Sullivan 3–2 Mark Williams
John Higgins 0–3 Barry Hawkins
Ricky Walden 0–3 Ronnie O'Sullivan
Robert Milkins 3–2 Ryan Day
Mark Williams 3–1 John Higgins
Barry Hawkins 2–3 Robert Milkins
Ronnie O'Sullivan 3–2 John Higgins
Ryan Day 2–3 Ricky Walden
Mark Williams 3–2 Barry Hawkins
Robert Milkins 1–3 Ricky Walden
Ryan Day 2–3 Barry Hawkins
John Higgins 3–1 Ricky Walden
Ronnie O'Sullivan 3–2 Ryan Day
Mark Williams 1–3 Robert Milkins
John Higgins 0–3 Ryan Day
Barry Hawkins 1–3 Ricky Walden
Ronnie O'Sullivan 3–1 Robert Milkins
Mark Williams 3–1 Ricky Walden
John Higgins 3–2 Robert Milkins
Mark Williams 3–1 Ryan Day
Ronnie O'Sullivan 3–1 Barry Hawkins

Table

Play-offs

Group two
Group two was played on 6 and 7 January 2016. The group was won by Judd Trump.

Matches

Mark Selby 3–2 Judd Trump
Joe Perry 2–3 Barry Hawkins
Ricky Walden 0–3 Mark Selby
Mark Williams 3–1 Robert Milkins
Judd Trump 1–3 Joe Perry
Barry Hawkins 1–3 Mark Williams
Mark Selby 3–1 Joe Perry
Robert Milkins 1–3 Ricky Walden
Judd Trump 3–0 Barry Hawkins
Mark Williams 2–3 Ricky Walden
Robert Milkins 3–1 Barry Hawkins
Joe Perry 3–1 Ricky Walden
Mark Selby 3–1 Robert Milkins
Judd Trump 3–2 Mark Williams
Joe Perry 3–2 Robert Milkins
Barry Hawkins 3–0 Ricky Walden
Mark Selby 3–2 Mark Williams
Judd Trump 0–3 Ricky Walden
Joe Perry 1–3 Mark Williams
Judd Trump 3–1 Robert Milkins
Mark Selby 3–0 Barry Hawkins

Table

Play-offs

Group three
Group three was played on 25 and 26 January 2016. The group was won by Stephen Maguire.

Matches

Stephen Maguire 3–1 Marco Fu
Michael White 0–3 Ricky Walden
Mark Selby 1–3 Stephen Maguire
Joe Perry 3–2 Mark Williams
Marco Fu 0–3 Michael White
Ricky Walden 3–2 Joe Perry
Stephen Maguire 3–2 Michael White
Mark Williams 0–3 Mark Selby
Marco Fu 3–0 Ricky Walden
Joe Perry 0–3 Mark Selby
Mark Williams 2–3 Ricky Walden
Michael White 3–2 Mark Selby
Stephen Maguire 2–3 Mark Williams
Marco Fu 0–3 Joe Perry
Michael White 3–2 Mark Williams
Ricky Walden 1–3 Mark Selby
Stephen Maguire 3–2 Joe Perry
Marco Fu 1–3 Mark Selby
Michael White 3–0 Joe Perry
Marco Fu 1–3 Mark Williams
Stephen Maguire 3–1 Ricky Walden

Table

Play-offs

Group four
Group four was played on 27 and 28 January 2016. The group was won by Mark Williams.

Matches

Neil Robertson 3–0 Ben Woollaston
Graeme Dott 1–3 Mark Williams
Ricky Walden 1–3 Neil Robertson
Michael White 2–3 Mark Selby
Ben Woollaston 3–0 Graeme Dott
Mark Williams 3–0 Michael White
Neil Robertson 2–3 Graeme Dott
Mark Selby 3–0 Ricky Walden
Ben Woollaston 1–3 Mark Williams
Michael White 0–3 Ricky Walden
Mark Selby 2–3 Mark Williams
Graeme Dott 3–2 Ricky Walden
Neil Robertson 1–3 Mark Selby
Ben Woollaston 1–3 Michael White
Graeme Dott 3–2 Mark Selby
Mark Williams 3–2 Ricky Walden
Neil Robertson 3–1 Michael White
Ben Woollaston 1–3 Ricky Walden
Graeme Dott 1–3 Michael White
Ben Woollaston 0–3 Mark Selby
Neil Robertson 3–2 Mark Williams

Table

Play-offs

Group five
Group five was played on 22 and 23 February 2016. Neil Robertson withdrew and was replaced by Michael Holt. The group was won by Mark Selby.

Matches

 David Gilbert 2–3 Mark Davis
 Kyren Wilson 3–0 Ricky Walden
 Graeme Dott 3–1 David Gilbert
 Michael Holt 0–3 Mark Selby
 Mark Davis 3–1 Kyren Wilson
 Ricky Walden 2–3 Michael Holt
 David Gilbert 1–3 Kyren Wilson
 Mark Selby 3–0 Graeme Dott
 Mark Davis 0–3 Ricky Walden
 Michael Holt 3–0 Graeme Dott
 Mark Selby 3–1 Ricky Walden
 Kyren Wilson 1–3 Graeme Dott
 David Gilbert 1–3 Mark Selby
 Mark Davis 3–1 Michael Holt
 Kyren Wilson 3–1 Mark Selby
 Ricky Walden 2–3 Graeme Dott
 David Gilbert 2–3 Michael Holt
 Mark Davis 3–1 Graeme Dott
 Kyren Wilson 3–1 Michael Holt
 Mark Davis 1–3 Mark Selby
 David Gilbert 3–0 Ricky Walden

Table

Play-offs

Group six
Group six was played on 24 and 25 February 2016. Graeme Dott withdrew and was replaced by Dominic Dale. The group was won by Ali Carter.

Matches

 Mark Davis 2–3 Kyren Wilson
 Fergal O'Brien 3–2 Martin Gould
 Allister Carter 3–1 Dominic Dale
 Michael Holt 2–3 Fergal O'Brien
 Martin Gould 1–3 Allister Carter
 Dominic Dale 2–3 Mark Davis
 Kyren Wilson 2–3 Michael Holt
 Fergal O'Brien 2–3 Allister Carter
 Martin Gould 1–3 Dominic Dale
 Mark Davis 3–1 Michael Holt
 Michael Holt 3–2 Allister Carter
 Kyren Wilson 2–3 Dominic Dale
 Fergal O'Brien 1–3 Kyren Wilson
 Martin Gould 3–2 Mark Davis
 Allister Carter 3–0 Kyren Wilson
 Dominic Dale 3–2 Michael Holt
 Michael Holt 3–1 Martin Gould
 Fergal O'Brien 1–3 Mark Davis
 Fergal O'Brien 0–3 Dominic Dale
 Martin Gould 3–2 Kyren Wilson
 Allister Carter 3–0 Mark Davis

Table

Play-offs

Group seven
Group seven was played on 29 February and 1 March 2016. Matthew Selt won the group to take the final spot in the winners' group.

Matches

 Matthew Selt 3–0 Liang Wenbo
 Stuart Bingham 1–3 Kyren Wilson
 Mark Davis 2–3 Matthew Selt
 Michael Holt 2–3 Dominic Dale
 Liang Wenbo 3–2 Stuart Bingham
 Kyren Wilson 3–0 Michael Holt
 Dominic Dale 1–3 Mark Davis
 Matthew Selt 2–3 Stuart Bingham
 Liang Wenbo 3–1 Kyren Wilson
 Michael Holt 2–3 Mark Davis
 Dominic Dale 1–3 Kyren Wilson
 Stuart Bingham 0–3 Mark Davis
 Matthew Selt 0–3 Dominic Dale
 Liang Wenbo 3–2 Michael Holt
 Stuart Bingham 3–1 Dominic Dale
 Kyren Wilson 1–3 Mark Davis
 Matthew Selt 3–1 Michael Holt
 Liang Wenbo 3–0 Mark Davis
 Stuart Bingham 3–1 Michael Holt
 Liang Wenbo 3–0 Dominic Dale
 Matthew Selt 3–2 Kyren Wilson

Table

Play-offs

Winners' group

The winners' group was played on 2 and 3 March 2016. Judd Trump beat Ronnie O'Sullivan 3–2 in the final to take the third Championship League title of his career.

Matches

 Ronnie O'Sullivan 3–0 Judd Trump
 Stephen Maguire 2–3 Mark Williams
 Mark Selby 2–3 Ronnie O'Sullivan
 Ali Carter 3–1 Matthew Selt
 Judd Trump 3–1 Stephen Maguire
 Mark Williams 3–0 Ali Carter
 Matthew Selt 3–0 Mark Selby
 Ronnie O'Sullivan 3–2 Stephen Maguire
 Judd Trump 3–0 Mark Williams
 Ali Carter 3–1 Mark Selby
 Matthew Selt 0–3 Mark Williams
 Stephen Maguire 3–2 Mark Selby
 Ronnie O'Sullivan 3–2 Matthew Selt
 Judd Trump 3–1 Ali Carter
 Stephen Maguire 1–3 Matthew Selt
 Mark Williams 0–3 Mark Selby
 Ronnie O'Sullivan 3–2 Ali Carter
 Judd Trump 2–3 Mark Selby
 Stephen Maguire 2–3 Ali Carter
 Judd Trump 2–3 Matthew Selt
 Ronnie O'Sullivan 0–3 Mark Williams

Table

Play-offs

Century breaks
Total: 96

147 (6)  Fergal O'Brien
144 (2), 137, 131, 130, 129, 119, 114, 111,110, 108, 105, 103, 102, 100, 100  Mark Williams
141 (W), 121, 120, 112  Matthew Selt
140 (4), 131, 117, 103  Neil Robertson
140 (7), 101  Stuart Bingham
139 (3), 138, 112, 110, 108, 102  Stephen Maguire
138 (1), 133, 107, 106, 102  Ricky Walden
136, 135, 134, 133, 131 (5), 129, 129, 123, 123,123, 119, 116, 111, 107, 101, 101, 100  Mark Selby
136, 134, 133, 126, 120, 119, 117, 115, 106  Ronnie O'Sullivan
134, 103  Mark Davis
134, 103  Dominic Dale
133, 129, 107, 101  Liang Wenbo
131, 110  Robert Milkins
129  Graeme Dott
126, 122  Marco Fu
123, 122, 103, 100, 100  Ali Carter
117, 117  Michael White
111, 106, 102, 100, 100  Kyren Wilson
110, 105  Ryan Day
105  Martin Gould
104  Ben Woollaston
103, 103, 102  Judd Trump
101  David Gilbert

''Bold: highest break in the indicated group.

Winnings

Green: won the group. Bold: highest break in the group. All prize money in GBP.

References

http://www.championshipleaguesnooker.co.uk/players/

2016
2016 in snooker
2016 in English sport
January 2016 sports events in the United Kingdom
February 2016 sports events in the United Kingdom
March 2016 sports events in the United Kingdom